Luciano Favero (born 11 October 1957) is a former Italian footballer who played as a defender. A well-rounded, tactically intelligent, and versatile defender, Favero was capable of playing anywhere along the back-line, although he was usually deployed as a centre-back. He stood out for his strength and powerful physical attributes throughout his career.

Career
Throughout his career, Favero played for Milanese (1975–76), Messina (1976–77), Salernitana (1977–78), Siracusa (1978–80), Rimini (1980–81), Avellino (1981–84), Juventus (1984–89), and Verona (1989–91), where he ended his career. In 1984, Juventus purchased him as a replacement for legendary defender Claudio Gentile, who had recently been sold to Fiorentina, forming a formidable defensive line-up alongside Antonio Cabrini and Gaetano Scirea. Favero played for Juventus between 1984 and 1989, and was notably a part of their European Cup victory in 1985, also winning a Serie A title, an Intercontinental Cup, and a European Super Cup during his time with the club.

Despite his success at club level, Favero, along with his Juventus defensive team-mate Sergio Brio, never made an appearance for the Italian national side.

Honours

Club
Siracusa
Coppa Italia Serie C: 1978–79

Juventus
Serie A: 1985–86
European Super Cup: 1984
European Cup: 1984–85 
Intercontinental Cup: 1985

References

1957 births
Living people
Association football defenders
Italian footballers
Serie A players
Serie B players
Juventus F.C. players
A.C.R. Messina players
U.S. Salernitana 1919 players
Rimini F.C. 1912 players
Hellas Verona F.C. players
U.S. Avellino 1912 players
A.S. Siracusa players